Chenas (also Romanized as Chenās, Chanas, and Chonās; also known as Chūnās) is a village in Qarah Kahriz Rural District, Qarah Kahriz District, Shazand County, Markazi Province, Iran. At the 2006 census, its population was 352, in 92 families.

References 

Populated places in Shazand County